Gao (also called Nggao) is an endangered Oceanic language spoken in the Solomon Islands. Its speakers live on Santa Isabel Island.

References

External links 
 Paradisec open access collection of recordings in Gao.
 Paradisec open access collection of field notes on Gao vocabulary.

Languages of the Solomon Islands
Endangered Austronesian languages
Ysabel languages
Vulnerable languages